Corydon Junction is an unincorporated community in Harrison County, Indiana, in the United States.

History
Corydon Junction was founded in 1833. It was a depot on the Louisville, New Albany and Corydon Railroad.

References

Unincorporated communities in Harrison County, Indiana
1833 establishments in Indiana
Unincorporated communities in Indiana
Populated places established in 1833